Windbalea is a genus of insect in family Tettigoniidae. It contains the following species:
Windbalea viride Rentz, 1993
Windbalea warrooa Rentz, 1993

References 

Tettigoniidae genera
Taxonomy articles created by Polbot